Germanic may refer to:

 Germanic peoples, an ethno-linguistic group identified by their use of the Germanic languages
 List of ancient Germanic peoples and tribes
 Germanic languages
 Proto-Germanic language, a reconstructed proto-language of all the Germanic languages
 Germanic name
 Germanic mythology, myths associated with Germanic paganism
 Germanic religion (disambiguation)
 SS Germanic (1874), a White Star Line steamship

See also
 Germania (disambiguation)
 Germanus (disambiguation)
 German (disambiguation)
 Germanicia Caesarea
 
 

Language and nationality disambiguation pages